Shabab Al-Dawr Sport Club is an Iraqi football team based in Saladin, that plays in Iraq Division Two.

Managerial history
  Adel Aoni Salih
  Majed Hameed 
  Ashraf Kamil Abbas

Honours
Iraq Division Two (third tier)
Winners: 2006–07

See also 
 1992–93 Iraq FA Cup
 2001–02 Iraq FA Cup
 2002–03 Iraq FA Cup
 2016–17 Iraq FA Cup

References

External links
 Shabab Al-Dawr SC on Goalzz.com
 Iraq Clubs- Foundation Dates

1987 establishments in Iraq
Association football clubs established in 1987
Football clubs in Saladin